Newark-Wayne Community Hospital, an affiliate hospital of Rochester Regional Health, is a 120-bed small community hospital in Wayne County, New York. Newark-Wayne Community Hospital was the first of its kind in New York to offer a telemedicine program to connect with its patients. The hospital also provides services including cardiology, urology, obstetrics, gynecology, orthopedics, and pulmonary care.

Services
Newark-Wayne is a New York State-designated Stroke Center, a Level 1 Perinatal Center, a NICHE (Nurses Improving Care for Healthsystem Elders) hospital and a recent recipient of the WHO Baby-Friendly designation.

The hospital's emergency department was renovated in March 2013. Following the renovations, it was named the Daniel Alexander M.D. Emergency Department.

Further renovations began in June 2016, part of Rochester Regional Health's system-wide modernization plan, to include a new modern exterior, add over 2,500 square feet of space, and renovate over 13,000 square feet of existing space to the hospital's main entrance. Additionally, a mediation space just off the waiting area will be built to give guests a quiet place to reflect and pray.

See also 
 Rochester Regional Health
 Unity Hospital
 Rochester General Hospital
 Strong Memorial Hospital
 Highland Hospital
 United Memorial Medical Center
 Clifton Springs Hospital & Clinic

External links 
 Hospital Website
 Youtube Link of New Emergency Department
 New York State Health Department Profile

References 

1921 establishments in New York (state)
Hospitals in Rochester, New York
Hospitals established in 1921